{{DISPLAYTITLE:D5 polytope}}

In 5-dimensional geometry, there are 23 uniform polytopes with D5 symmetry, 8 are unique, and 15 are shared with the B5 symmetry. There are two special forms, the 5-orthoplex, and 5-demicube with 10 and 16 vertices respectively.

They can be visualized as symmetric orthographic projections in Coxeter planes of the D6 Coxeter group, and other subgroups.


Graphs 

Symmetric orthographic projections of these 8 polytopes can be made in the D5, D4, D3, A3, Coxeter planes. Ak has [k+1] symmetry, Dk has [2(k-1)] symmetry. The B5 plane is included, with only half the [10] symmetry displayed.

These 8 polytopes are each shown in these 5 symmetry planes, with vertices and edges drawn, and vertices colored by the number of overlapping vertices in each projective position.

References
 H.S.M. Coxeter:
 H.S.M. Coxeter, Regular Polytopes, 3rd Edition, Dover New York, 1973
 Kaleidoscopes: Selected Writings of H.S.M. Coxeter, edited by F. Arthur Sherk, Peter McMullen, Anthony C. Thompson, Asia Ivic Weiss, Wiley-Interscience Publication, 1995,  
 (Paper 22) H.S.M. Coxeter, Regular and Semi Regular Polytopes I, [Math. Zeit. 46 (1940) 380-407, MR 2,10]
 (Paper 23) H.S.M. Coxeter, Regular and Semi-Regular Polytopes II, [Math. Zeit. 188 (1985) 559-591]
 (Paper 24) H.S.M. Coxeter, Regular and Semi-Regular Polytopes III, [Math. Zeit. 200 (1988) 3-45]
 N.W. Johnson: The Theory of Uniform Polytopes and Honeycombs, Ph.D. Dissertation, University of Toronto, 1966

Notes

5-polytopes